The 1882 Nevada gubernatorial election was held on November 7, 1882.

Lieutenant Governor Jewett W. Adams defeated Republican nominee Enoch Strother with 54.32% of the vote.

General election

Candidates
Major party candidates
Jewett W. Adams, Democratic, incumbent Lieutenant Governor
Enoch Strother, Republican, businessman and register in bankruptcy

Results

References

1882
Nevada
Gubernatorial